Extirpator of Idolatries is a 2014 Peruvian thriller drama film written and directed by Manuel Siles, completed in 2014 and released commercially in Peru in 2016.

Plot 
The police detective Waldo, of circumspect disposition and temper, investigates several crimes associated with indigenous rituals that occur in some regions of the Peruvian Andes. There a boy and a girl who are about to enter puberty begin to interact with certain mythical beings, a supernatural belief very common in many Andean villages. A sinister character (the “Extirpator of Idolatries”), pretending to be on a mission of faith, but imbued with religious dogmatism and intolerance, interrupts this peaceful scene as he casts an ominous shadow over these ancient Peruvian beliefs. Although Waldo’s boss considers him inferior and distrusts his methods, the policeman continues his efforts to capture the “Extirpator of Idolatries”. At the same time, Waldo will resolve his own inner conflict which has troubled him all his life.

Cast 

 Oswaldo Salas as police detective Waldo Mamani / Mythical creature
 Magaly Solier as mother of the boy
 Augusto Casafranca as extirpator of idolatries / Mythical creature
 Paulina Bazán as the girl
 Diego Yupanqui as the boy
 Renato Gianoli as chief police
 Oscar Ludeña as police deputy / Mythical creature
 Fiorella Flores as TV journalist
 Amiel Cayo as shaman / Mythical creature
 Julián Vargas as innkeeper
 Firelei Barreda as widow
 Ana Arce as mother of the girl / Mythical creature
 Diana Castro as victim

Reception

Critical response
Extirpador of idolatries had a positive reception from audiences and critics at international film festivals, winning thirty two awards, and obtaining nine nominations. Peruvian critics praised the film after its premiere in Lima, film critic Sebastián Pimentel of the newspaper El Comercio calls it "a new title among the best of Peruvian cinema in recent years." He praises the work of the leading actor ("great Oswaldo Salas") and the director ("Siles has assimilated well a modern film tradition that goes beyond Europe - come to mind 'Antonio das Mortes' of the Brazilian Glauber Rocha, even the most contemporary films by Claudia Llosa, through the cinema of the Thai director Apichatpong Weerasethakul - As in the cases cited, far from verbalizing facts, Siles explores affections, beliefs, imaginaries, the latter taking the form of dreams or hallucinations that challenge the realism of what we see "). He considers it one of the 20 best commercial premieres in Peru in 2016, being one of only three Peruvian films included in the list. In the newspaper La República, the film critic Federico de Cárdenas qualifies it with 4 stars out of 5, describing it as "valuable opera prima", praises photography ("remarkable photography and camera of Marco Antonio Alvarado") and Magaly Solier's performance. Film critic Ricardo Bedoya considers it "one of the most suggestive Peruvian films of recent times".

Awards

Trivia 
 Shot with a Canon EOS 5D Mark II camera
 For the filming of the children's scene with the mythical beings, a large number of actors and extras were needed. As a matter of budget, the actors of the film, Oswaldo Salas, Augusto Casafranca, Oscar Ludeña, Amiel Cayo and Ana Arce supported the filming personifying a group of mythical beings. The actress Katerina D'Onofrio also participated as a cameo role. Karina Chocos, mother in the real life of Paulina Bazán, also acted as a mythical being.

References

External links 

 
 
2014 thriller drama films
Peruvian thriller drama films
2010s Peruvian films
2014 directorial debut films